Westminster House is a commercial facility on the south east side of Portland Street, Manchester. As "County Hall", it was the headquarters of Greater Manchester County Council from its formation in April 1974 to its abolition in March 1986.

History
In the mid-19th century the site on the south east side of Portland Street had been occupied by a row of residential and retail properties which included the Portland Street Silk Mill; the area in the next block to the south east of the site (on the south east side of Major Street) was known at that time as Westminster Place and this may have been, in part, the origin of the name. The site itself continued to be occupied by the same aging residential and retail properties until the mid-20th century.

The building, which was designed by Fitzroy Robinson & Partners and built at the cost of £4.5 million (£ as of ), was completed in 1973. The design for the seven-storey building involved a main frontage on Portland Street with wings stretching back along Minshull Street and Aytoun Street; the ground floor was designated for retail use and the windows on the first floor were slightly recessed; the upper floors featured a continuous bands of glazing with red brick above and below the glazing.

The building was acquired for use as the headquarters of Greater Manchester County Council on the county council's formation in April 1974. It was originally referred to as County Hall and, although the county council officers and their departments were based at County Hall, the full county council would meet at Manchester Town Hall. The building was vacated by Greater Manchester County Council on its abolition in March 1986.

In 1988 the building was sold for circa £5 million to Parc Securities who refurbished it and converted it for commercial use. It was then sold on, in 1990, for circa £22 million to County Hall Properties who renamed it "Westminster House"; it was suggested in The Independent that this may have been, in part, to honour the Westminster Government of Margaret Thatcher which had abolished the Greater Manchester County Council. The building was later acquired by Aviva Investors, who commissioned an extensive programme of refurbishment works costing £18 million which were carried out by contractors, Styles & Wood, to a design by BDP and completed in summer 2017. Following completion of the refurbishment works, the building was renamed again, this time simply to 11 Portland Street.

Notable residents as of 2022 include Arm Limited.

References

Buildings and structures in Manchester
County halls in England
Government buildings completed in 1973